Nicotina is a six-time Ariel Award winning and six-time nominated 2003 Mexican-Argentine gangster film produced by the same team as the 2000 acclaimed film Amores perros. It is a "real time movie".

Plot 

Lolo is a male computer science geek who tangles with a clutch of the Russian mafia, when he delivers the wrong computer disk to them and with the disastrous results of drugs and smoking tobacco.

Cast
Diego Luna as Lolo
Lucas Crespi as Nene
Norman Sotolongo as Svóboda
Jesús Ochoa as Tomson
Martha Tenorio as Eulogia (as Marta Tenorio)
Rafael Inclán as Goyo
Rosa María Bianchi as Carmen
José María Yazpik as Joaquín
Marta Belaustegui as Andrea
Eugenio Montessoro as Carlos
Carmen Madrid as Clara
Daniel Giménez Cacho as Beto
Alexis Sánchez as Andrei
Jorge Zárate as Sánchez
Enoc Leaño as  Memo

Bibliography
 Arranging The Actors To Promote Nicotine Fits, The New York Times, A. O. Scott, 20 August 2004
 Nicotina - review, Plume-noire, Anji Milanovic, Access date: 31 May 2022
 Nicotina, Political Film Society, 3 January 2003

References

External links

2003 films
Argentine crime comedy-drama films
2000s Spanish-language films
2000s crime comedy-drama films
Mexican crime comedy-drama films
Gangster films
Films about drugs
Films set in Mexico City
2003 comedy films
2003 drama films
2000s Argentine films
2000s Mexican films